Kuppanatham Dam is a partially completed dam situated in Tiruvannamalai district, Tamil Nadu, India. The nearest town is Chengam Taluk's Paramanandal. The dam was built 1987 on the in Solai River. Today it is rewarded as township with population over 300. It is in the altitude of 435m. The government has plans to finish the dam in the future.

References 

Tiruvannamalai district
Dams in Tamil Nadu
1987 establishments in Tamil Nadu
Dams completed in 1987
20th-century architecture in India